Cychrus szetshuanus is a species of ground beetle in the subfamily of Carabinae. It was described by Stephan von Breuning in 1931.

References

szetshuanus
Beetles described in 1931